Dětmar, Thietmar or Dietmar (died 2 January 982 in Prague) was the first Bishop of Prague. He came from Saxony and learned to speak Czech. The diocese of Prague was assigned to the archbishopric of Mainz, when Thietmar was elected as the first bishop in 973 at the time of government by Boleslaus II of Bohemia. The creation of the diocese gave Bohemia religious independence from the Empire. Thietmar  was known to be a wise and pious man, who ordered the building of many churches and the first cathedral. He died in 982. Adalbert of Prague was elected as his successor.

10th-century births
982 deaths
10th-century Saxon bishops
10th-century bishops in Bohemia
Roman Catholic bishops of Prague
Czech people of German descent